The Kansas City Southern Bridge is a rail crossing of the Kansas River. It has two main spans, and a smaller span at the west end. It is a thru-truss, and closed to traffic. It was built in 1905, by the Kansas City Southern Railway, and was closed in 1983. The bridge's rails are cut off at each end. It survived the 1951 Kansas City flood.

See also
Kansas City Southern Railroad Bridge, Cross Bayou, Shreveport, Louisiana

Bridges in Kansas City, Kansas
Bridges over the Kansas River
Railroad bridges in Kansas
Bridges completed in 1905
Kansas City Southern Railway bridges
1905 establishments in Kansas